Complement component 7 is a protein involved in the complement system of the innate immune system. C7 is part of the membrane attack complex (MAC) which creates a hole on pathogen surfaces, leading to cell lysis and death.

Its primary task is to bind the C5bC6 complex together. This junction alters the configuration of the protein molecules, exposing a hydrophobic site on C7 that allows the C7 to insert into the phospholipid bilayer of the pathogen.

See also
 Terminal complement pathway deficiency

External links

References

Complement system